The pearl crescent (Phyciodes tharos) is a butterfly of North America. It is found in all parts of the United States except the west coast, and throughout Mexico and parts of southern Canada, in particular Ontario. Its habitat is open areas such as pastures, road edges, vacant lots, fields, open pine woods. Its pattern is quite variable. Males usually have black antenna knobs. Its upperside is orange with black borders; postmedian and submarginal areas are crossed by fine black marks. The underside of the hindwing has a dark marginal patch containing a light-colored crescent.

The wingspan is from 21 to 34 mm. The species has several broods throughout the year, from April–November in the north, and throughout the year in the deep south and Mexico.

Adults find nectar from a great variety of flowers including dogbane, swamp milkweed, shepherd's needle, asters, and winter cress. Males patrol open areas for females. The eggs are laid in small batches on the underside of host plant leaves of aster species (family Asteraceae). Caterpillars eat the leaves and are gregarious when young. Hibernation is by third-stage caterpillars.

Similar species
 Phyciodes batesii – tawny crescent
 Phyciodes cocyta – northern crescent

References

 
 
 
 

Butterflies of North America
Taxa named by Dru Drury
Melitaeini
Butterflies described in 1773